The Battle of Port Gamble was an isolated engagement between the United States and the Tlingit. It occurred during, but was not a part of, the Yakima War. Though a minor incident, it is historically notable for the first U.S. Navy battle death in the Pacific Ocean.

Background
The Haida of British Columbia and Alaska and others had, since time immemorial, periodically conducted raiding expeditions against the Coast Salish peoples of the Puget Sound, who were used as a source for slave labor. Northwest Coast Native maritime technology was unsurpassed among First Nations peoples and raiding parties would travel in large dugout canoes at distances of up to a thousand miles. The largest of these canoes could hold 100 warriors and their equipment. These raids continued even after the demarcation of the border between the United States and Canada, then controlled by the United Kingdom.

Conflict
In November 1856 a Tlingit party, consisting of approximately 100 warriors and their accompanying families, entered Puget Sound in a fleet of canoes, in what was then the Washington Territory. When the force approached the town of Steilacoom, residents alerted the U.S. Army garrison at Fort Steilacoom who, in turn, sent word to the nearby U.S. Navy gunboat . However, before USS Massachusetts could arrive the Haida had already withdrawn north.

On November 20 the Tlingit approached the logging community of Port Gamble, near which was located the Port Gamble Band of S’Klallam Indians some of the members of which worked at the nearby sawmill. Josiah Keller, superintendent of the mill, sounded the mill's whistle prompting the community to evacuate to a blockhouse that had been previously constructed for this eventuality. USS Massachusetts arrived at Port Gamble soon thereafter and, finding that the Haida party had landed and camped at the edge of town, placed a force of 18 armed sailors ashore. The skipper of USS Massachusetts, Commander Samuel Swartwout, twice sent messengers to the Tlingit chiefs with offers to tow them to Victoria, but each offer was rebuffed. The next morning, Swartwout began shelling the Haida camp with the deck guns of the Massachusetts, inflicting heavy casualties on the party before they managed to retreat to the forest. During the Haida withdrawal, small arms fire was exchanged between the war party and USS Massachusetts''' sailors, resulting in the death of coxswain Gustavus Engelbrecht, the only American casualty in the battle and the first U.S. Navy battle death in the Pacific.  The Haida having abandoned the field, the landing party from USS Massachusetts proceeded to destroy the beached Haida canoes and burn their provisions.

Two days later the surviving Haida surrendered. The Tlingit prisoners were issued a ration of bread and molasses and given 24 hours to bury their dead, after which they were taken aboard USS Massachusetts with the intention of deporting them to British Columbia. When USS Massachusetts'' arrived in Victoria, however, British Columbia governor James Douglas objected to the landing of the Haida in the colony. In a dispatch sent to colonial secretary Henry Labouchère, Douglas described Swartwout's reaction,

Swartwout and Douglas eventually reached a compromise: the Tlingit were provisioned with food and new canoes, then dropped-off at the edge of Russian America.

Aftermath
One of the Tlingit killed in the Battle of Port Gamble was a chief and, under Tlingit custom, a chief of the enemy had to be killed in revenge. On August 11, 1857, the Tlingit returned to Washington Territory, landing at Whidbey Island. After inquiring among settlers if there were any chiefs around, they determined that Isaac N. Ebey was the most important person on the island and shot and decapitated him, before departing for home with Ebey's head as a trophy. [A likeness of Ebey was carved on the front of a war helmet by a Kake Tlingit artist with Ebey's head as his model.]{Duane Pasco}

With increased policing of the Canada–United States border, Northern incursions into Washington steadily dropped in the years following the Battle of Port Gamble. Later incidents involving the Haida and United States tribes occurred in 1859 when Suquamish warriors repelled a Haida landing on the western shore of Bainbridge Island; a confrontation between the Snohomish and Tlingit in August 1860.

See also
Ebey's Landing National Historical Reserve

References

Port Gamble
1856 in the United States
Port Gamble
November 1856 events
Haida